"Funny Way of Laughin'" is a song written by Hank Cochran and performed by Burl Ives.  It reached #3 on the U.S. adult contemporary chart, #9 on the U.S. country chart, #10 on the U.S. pop chart, and #29 on the UK Singles Chart in 1962.  It was featured on his 1962 album It's Just My Funny Way of Laughin'.

The song won the Grammy Award for Best Country & Western Recording at the 5th Annual Grammy Awards in 1963.

The song ranked #82 on Billboard magazine's Top 100 singles of 1962.

Other versions
Cochran released a version of the song on his 1963 album Hits from the Heart.
Jeannie Seely released a version of the song as the B-side to her 1967 single "These Memories".
Jim Ed Brown released a version of the song on his 1968 album Country's Best on Record.

References

1962 songs
1962 singles
Songs written by Hank Cochran
Burl Ives songs
Jeannie Seely songs
Jim Ed Brown songs
Decca Records singles
Song recordings produced by Bob Ferguson (musician)
Song recordings produced by Fred Foster